Sarah Bianchi is a political advisor and former investment analyst serving as deputy United States trade representative (USTR). Prior to her confirmation as deputy USTR, she was a senior managing director at Evercore ISI, a global investment banking advisory firm.

Early life and education

Bianchi was born in Atlanta. She attended Harvard University, where she was roommates with Karenna Gore, the daughter of Vice President Al Gore, at Leverett House.

Career 
In a New York Times profile of Bianchi published on September 4, 2000, her career after her graduation is described to have included work as "an assistant to the associate director for health at the Office of Management and Budget, an assistant director for health policy of the Domestic Policy Council, the senior health care adviser to the vice president and...as deputy issues director" of the Al Gore's 2000 presidential campaign.

Bianchi later served as national policy director on John Kerry's 2004 presidential campaign. She also worked on the United States Senate Committee on Health, Education, Labor and Pensions for Senator Ted Kennedy, specializing on health policy. After serving on the campaigns of Gore and John Kerry, Bianchi joined the private sector.

While in government, Bianchi served as Deputy Assistant to the President for Economic Policy under President Barack Obama. Bianchi served as director of policy for Vice President Joe Biden from 2011 to 2014. USA Today wrote that Bianchi "helped Vice President Biden formulate the 23 executive actions in response to the Sandy Hook Elementary School massacre" and participated in the development of gun control legislation.

Bianchi also served as chair of the policy advisory board at the Biden Institute at the University of Delaware and was identified as a potential addition to the Joe Biden 2020 presidential campaign team by The Hill and The New York Times.

Private sector

While Bianchi was at Evercore ISI, Bloomberg News reported on the 'Wall Street' view of the 2019 impeachment inquiry against Donald Trump, and quoted Bianchi, including her perspective that it could make other action more difficult, including prescription drug pricing legislation and the USMCA, and that it is "very possible that it will just further put each side in their respective camps and further polarize the country. What it does to the moderate middle of the road voters is very hard to say." Before the 2020 election, Bianchi was interviewed by CNBC about the potential impact of the election on the market.

Before Evercore ISI, Bianchi worked as head of global policy development at Airbnb.

Biden administration 
After the November 2020 election, Bianchi was named to a leadership position in president-elect Joe Biden's Covid transition team. On April 16, 2021, the Biden administration announced an intent to nominate Bianchi as a deputy trade representative in the Office of the United States Trade Representative for Asia, Africa, investment, services, textiles, and industrial competitiveness. The US Senate confirmed her nomination by an 85–11 vote on September 23, 2021. She was sworn in by Katherine Tai on October 4, 2021.

References

External links

1973 births
Harvard University alumni
Living people
Obama administration personnel
Biden administration personnel
Alumni of The Paideia School